The Horace Hearne Jr. Institute for Theoretical Physics is at Louisiana State University. The Hearne Institute is funded by a donation of two endowed chairs by Horace Hearne Jr. and the State of Louisiana, as  well as additional grants from a variety of national and international granting agencies. It currently has as co-directors Jonathan Dowling and Jorge Pullin. The institute hosts faculty, postdoctoral researchers, students — as well as long- and short-term visitors — who conduct research on quantum technologies and on gravitational physics. The Hearne Institute also sponsors international workshops on quantum information theory, quantum technologies, relativity and quantum gravity.

References

External links

Physics institutes
Louisiana State University